John Nash is an American broadcaster and executive. He was an NBA general manager of the Philadelphia 76ers, New Jersey Nets, Portland Trail Blazers, and Washington Bullets. He also has worked as a broadcaster for Comcast, and in several other NBA front office jobs.

His contract with the Trail Blazers was not renewed after the conclusion of the 2005–06 season. He signed with the Philadelphia 76ers for the 2008-09 season as a Pro Personal Scout.

Nash is a member of the Big Five Hall of Fame where he worked from 1976 to 1981 with future NBA coaches Chuck Daly, Paul Westhead, Jim Lynam and Don Casey as well as, Rollie Massimino who had NBA opportunities but remained a successful college coach.

Nash is also a member of his high school, Monsignor Bonner's Hall of Fame and a member of the Delaware County Sports Hall of Fame.

Prior to his career in Basketball, Nash worked as the Ticket Manager for the Philadelphia Flyers from 1973 to 1975. He is one of a very small list of people to have both an NHL and NBA championship ring. 

He now owns the company Jayenne Associates where he oversees the training, racing, and breeding of thoroughbred horses. He also serves on the board of directors for the Pennsylvania Thoroughbred Horsemen's Association.  

Nash has also served as Assistant Publicity Manager for the Atlantic City Racecourse and Ticket Manager of The Philadelphia Blazers of the World Hockey Association.

Notable Drafted Players 

 

*Nash was Assistant General Manager during Barkley's obtainment.

References

Year of birth missing (living people)
Living people
National Basketball Association executives
New Jersey Nets executives
Philadelphia 76ers executives
Portland Trail Blazers executives
Washington Wizards executives